Holenice is a municipality and village in Semily District in the Liberec Region of the Czech Republic. It has about 90 inhabitants.

References

Villages in Semily District